Jason Eckardt (born 17 May 1971 in Princeton, New Jersey) is an American composer. He began his musical life playing guitar in heavy metal and jazz bands and abruptly moved to composing after discovering the music of Anton Webern.

Compositions
Atonal and microtonal harmony, intricate rhythms, highly polyphonic textures and large-scale transformational processes are prevalent in Eckardt's compositions. Allan Kozinn of The New York Times wrote that Eckardt's music "celebrates harmonic prickliness, rhythmic complexity and a density of ideas". Though Eckardt has been associated with the New Complexity movement, he is also influenced by American composers Milton Babbitt and Elliott Carter.

Major works include Passage (2018) for string quartet, After Serra (2000) for chamber ensemble, Tongues (2001) for soprano and chamber ensemble, Reul na Coille (2002) for percussion and orchestra, Trespass (2005) for piano and chamber orchestra and the Undersong cycle (2002–2008), a series of four chamber works (A way [tracing], 16, Aperture, The Distance (This)) that, when played together without pause, form a concert-length supercomposition.

Some of Eckardt's compositions are inspired by extramusical subjects, such as extraordinary rendition (Rendition), the sculptures of Richard Serra (After Serra), W. S. Merwin's poem "Echoes" (Echoes' White Veil) and George W. Bush's 2003 State of the Union Address (16). Subject, part one of Passage, a work for string quartet, uses special concert lighting to recreate the conditions used to interrogate military detainees. Eckardt has also written about the influence of research in cognitive psychology on his compositional techniques.

Eckardt has received commissions for his work from several major institutions and performers including Carnegie Hall, Tanglewood, the Koussevitzky Foundation (1999, 2011), the Guggenheim Museum, the Fromm Foundation at Harvard University (1996, 2008), Chamber Music America, the New York State Music Fund, Meet the Composer, the Oberlin Conservatory and percussionist Evelyn Glennie. His works have been programmed internationally by festivals including the Festival d'Automne a Paris, IRCAM-Resonances, ISCM World Music Days (1999, 2000), Darmstädter Ferienkurse, Musica Strasbourg, Voix Nouvelles, Musik im 20. Jahrhundert, Musikhost, Currents in Musical Thought-Seoul, New Consortium, International Review of Contemporary Music, Festival of New American Music and the International Bartok Festival. Eckardt's catalog is published by Carl Fischer Music.

Career
Eckardt has taught composition, theory and musicology at Columbia University, the Peabody Conservatory, the Oberlin Conservatory, New York University, the University of Illinois, Rutgers University and Northwestern University. He is also the co-founder of Ensemble 21, the contemporary music chamber ensemble based in New York City. He is currently professor of composition at City University of New York's Conservatory of Music at Brooklyn College and Graduate Center.

Awards
In 2004, Eckardt was awarded a Guggenheim Fellowship. Eckardt has also earned fellowships from the Rockefeller Foundation, the American Academy of Arts and Letters, Fondation Royaumont, the MacDowell and Millay colonies, the National Foundation for Advancement in the Arts, the Fritz Reiner Center for Contemporary Music, the Composers Conference at Wellesley, the Atlantic Center for the Arts, and the Yvar Mikhashoff Trust for New Music. Eckardt's compositions have received awards from the League of Composers/ISCM (National Prize), the Deutscher Musikrat (Stadt Wesel) (Symposium NRW Prize), ASCAP (Morton Gould Award), the University of Illinois (Salvatore Martirano Memorial Composition Award) and Columbia University (Rapoport Prize).

Education
Eckardt attended Berklee College of Music, first as a guitar performance major before switching to composition, eventually earning a BA (1992). He continued his studies at Columbia University, principally with Jonathan Kramer, and earned MA (1994) and DMA (1998) degrees. He attended masterclasses with Milton Babbitt, James Dillon, Brian Ferneyhough, Jonathan Harvey, and Karlheinz Stockhausen.

List of compositions
 Multiplicities (1993) for solo flute
 Flux (1994/95) for alto flute and 'cello
 Excelsior ab Intra (1994) for soprano, 2 countertenors, baritone
 A Harvest of Thorns (1995) for two guitars
 Echoes' White Veil (1996) for solo piano
 Tangled Loops (1996) for soprano saxophone and piano
 Cuts (1996) for solo piano
 Paths of Resistance (1997) for solo guitar
 Polarities (1998) for chamber ensemble
 Transience (1999) for solo marimba
 A Glimpse Retraced (1999) for piano and chamber ensemble
 After Serra (2000) for chamber ensemble
 Dithyramb (2001) for solo soprano
 Equilibrium (2001) for voice and guitar
 Tongues (2001) for soprano and chamber ensemble
 Performance (2001) for mezzo-soprano and piano
 Reul na Coille (2002) for solo percussion and orchestra
 16 (2003) for amplified flute and string trio
 A Fractured Silence (2004) for saxophone quartet
 Mirror-glass skyscrapers (2004) for mezzo-soprano and piano
 Trespass (2005) for piano solo and chamber orchestra
 Rendition (2006) for bass clarinet and piano
 Sweet Creature (2006) for solo bodhrán
 A way [tracing] (2006) for solo 'cello
 Still (2007) for solo baritone saxophone
 Aperture (2007) for chamber ensemble
 The Distance (This) (2008) for soprano and chamber ensemble
 Riddle (2009) for piano solo
 Subject (2011) for string quartet with lighting
 Strömkarl (2012) for violin and piano
 pulse-echo (2013) for piano and string quartet
 Ascension (2014) for string quartet with lighting
 The Silenced (2015) a monodrama for flutist
 suspension/bridge (2015) for guitar solo
 Whorl (2016) for guitar and chamber ensemble
 Toll (2017) for piano four hands
 Compression (2017) for trombone solo
 Testify (2018) for string quartet with lighting
 a melody which the air had strained (2019) for piano solo
 Fated Nines (2020) for string trio
 Jarog (2021) for solo 'cello, two bows
 A Compendium of Catskill Native Botanicals, book 2 (2014-)

Discography
 Jason Eckardt: Subject (featuring JACK Quartet, Jordan Dodson, Marilyn Nonken and Oberlin Contemporary Ensemble, Eric Lamb and Jay Campbell, Tony Arnold and International Contemporary Ensemble), Tzadik 9006.
 Jason Eckardt: Undersong (featuring A way [tracing], 16, Aperture, The Distance (This)), Mode 234.
 Jason Eckardt: Out of Chaos (featuring After Serra, Tangled Loops, A Glimpse Retraced, Polarities), Mode 137.
 Stephanie Lamprea: Quaking Aspen (featuring Quaking Aspen), New Focus FCR313.
 Resonant Bodies/Tony Arnold: Resonant Bodies (featuring Dithyramb), New Focus FCR289.
 Claire Chase: Density 2036, iii (featuring The Silenced), CvsD CD076.
 Wendy Richman: vox/viola (featuring "to be held..."), New Focus/Tundra 008.
 Oerknal Ensemble: narrow numerous (featuring 16), 7 Mountain 012.
 Collide-O-Scope Music: Eidos (featuring Rendition), Hanging Bell 193428195981.
 Rebekah Heller: Metafagote (featuring Wild Ginger), New Focus/Tundra 006.
 Victoria Jordanova: Lady Fern (single), ArpaViva S001.
 Miranda Cuckson and Blair McMillen: Carter, Sessions, Eckardt (featuring Strömkarl), Urlicht 5989.
 Prism Saxophone Quartet: Dedication (featuring A Fractured Silence), Innova 800.
 Amy Briggs: Tangos for Piano (featuring Tango Clandestino), Revello RR7808.
 Jean Kopperud: Extreme Measures (featuring Rendition), Albany 1217/18.
 Claire Chase: Aliento (featuring 16), New Focus FCR 109.
 Nathan Nabb: Tangled Loops (featuring Tangled Loops), Amp 12.
 Michael Lipsey: So Long, Thanks... (featuring Sweet Creature), Capstone CPS-8773.
 Makoto Nakura: Ritual Protocol (featuring Transience), Kleos 5116.
 Nancy Ruffer: Multiplicities (featuring Multiplicities), Metier MSV92063.
 Marilyn Nonken: American Spiritual (featuring Echoes' White Veil), CRI 877.

Publications
"Broadening Knowledge: An Interview with Ursula Oppens." American Music Review, 2008.
"L'élaboration de surface d'ensembles de classes de hauteurs par l'utilisation de paramèters autres que ceux des hauteurs." Musique-Sciences, 2007.
"Process and Timbral Transformation in 16." Arcana: Musicians on Music, vol. 2. Hips Road. (ed. John Zorn), 2007.
"Devenir." L'Etincelle/IRCAM. November 2006, no. 1, 2006.
"Musikhøst Set Udefra." , no. 3, 2005.
"Surface Elaboration of Pitch-Class Sets Using Nonpitched Musical Dimensions." Perspectives of New Music, vol. 43, no. 1, 2005.
"Listening and Composing." Current Musicology, issue 67 & 68, 2002.
"Review of An Introduction to the Music of Milton Babbitt by Andrew Mead." Current Musicology, issue 63, 2000.

References

External links
 
 Jason Eckardt's page at Carl Fischer
 Mode Records artist profile
 CUNY Graduate Center faculty page
 Brooklyn College CUNY faculty page

21st-century classical composers
20th-century classical composers
American male classical composers
American classical composers
Brooklyn College faculty
Graduate Center, CUNY faculty
1971 births
Living people
21st-century American composers
20th-century American composers
20th-century American male musicians
21st-century American male musicians